Dipak Tailor is a retired male badminton player from England.

Badminton career
Tailor represented England and won a gold medal in the team event, at the 1982 Commonwealth Games in Brisbane, Queensland, Australia. He also competed in the singles, men's doubles and mixed doubles.

Achievements

IBF World Grand Prix 
The World Badminton Grand Prix sanctioned by International Badminton Federation (IBF) from 1983 to 2006.

Men's doubles

References

English male badminton players
1964 births
Living people
Commonwealth Games medallists in badminton
Commonwealth Games gold medallists for England
Badminton players at the 1982 Commonwealth Games
Medallists at the 1982 Commonwealth Games